Baisha Subdistrict is a subdistrict in Jiangcheng District, Yangjiang, Guangdong, China. , it has one residential community and 12 villages under its administration.

See also 
 List of township-level divisions of Guangdong

References 

Township-level divisions of Guangdong
Yangjiang